Ricky Tyler Thomas (born December 22, 1995) is an American professional baseball pitcher who is currently a free agent.

Career
Thomas attended Mira Mesa Senior High School in San Diego. He enrolled at California State University, Fresno, and played college baseball for the Fresno State Bulldogs.

The Chicago Cubs selected Thomas in the seventh round of the 2017 MLB draft and he signed, receiving a $175,000 bonus. He made his professional debut that year with the Eugene Emeralds where he was 1–0 with a 2.33 ERA in 19.1 relief innings pitched. He began 2018 with the South Bend Cubs.

On July 19, 2018, the Cubs traded Thomas to the Rangers for Jesse Chavez. The Rangers assigned him to the Hickory Crawdads and promoted him to the Down East Wood Ducks in August. In 22 games (twenty starts) between South Bend, Hickory, and the Wood Ducks, Thomas compiled a 3–9 record with a 3.00 ERA over 105 innings. Thomas was assigned back to Down East for the 2019 season, going 0–2 with a 5.19 ERA over just  innings due to a non-disclosed injury. Thomas did not play in 2020 due to the cancellation of the Minor League Baseball season because of the COVID-19 pandemic.

References

External links 

Fresno State Bulldogs bio

Minor league baseball players